Karen Dixon  (née Straker; born 17 September 1964) is a British equestrian. She was born in County Durham, England. She won a silver medal in team eventing at the 1988 Olympic Games in Seoul. She also competed at the 1992, 1996 and 2000 Olympics. She won World Team Silver in 1990 and World Team Gold in 1994. In addition to this she has taken two individual bronze medals at the Europeans in 1991 and at the Worlds in 1994. Her two most famous former top horses have been "Get Smart" and "Too Smart". She has had five top ten Badminton Horse Trials placings, coming 5th in 1988, 6th in 1989, 9th in 1990, and 10th in 1991 and 1994.

References

1964 births
Living people
Sportspeople from County Durham
British event riders
English female equestrians
Olympic equestrians of Great Britain
British female equestrians
Olympic silver medallists for Great Britain
Equestrians at the 1988 Summer Olympics
Equestrians at the 1992 Summer Olympics
Equestrians at the 1996 Summer Olympics
Equestrians at the 2000 Summer Olympics
Olympic medalists in equestrian
Medalists at the 1988 Summer Olympics